Brad Flaishans is an American former ice hockey defenseman who was an All-American for New Hampshire.

Career
Flaishans arrived in Durham after a stellar final season of junior hockey that saw him named as an All-Star. While he was not yet one of the team's leaders, Flaishans did help UNH produce its 9th consecutive 20-win season as a freshman. The team reached the Hockey East championship game and also made an appearance in the NCAA Tournament for the 4th straight year. The team slipped a bit during his sophomore season but remained one of the top teams in the east. During his junior season, Flaishans took over as the premier defender on the Wildcats, more than doubling his offensive output and leading the team to a first place finish in the conference standings. While the team again fell in the Hockey East title game, they received the #4 overall seed for the 2007 Tournament. The UNH offense failed, with Flaishans assisting on their only goal in a 1–2 loss.

For his senior season, Flaishans was named an alternate captain and produced a near repeat performance. New Hampshire was again first in the standings and one of the favorites to compete for a national championship. For the third time in Flaishans' four years, UNH had its run in the conference tournament ended by Boston College, this time losing in triple overtime in the semifinal. Despite the loss, the Wildcats were the #4 seed for the second straight season. In their opening game, Flaishans assisted on two of New Hampshire's goals, leaving the team down by only 1 goal entering the third period. Notre Dame scored right after the puck dropped and in the fight to get the goal back, UNH ended up taking two separate minor penalties. While both were successfully killed off, time became a factor and the team began pressing harder. With less than 5 minutes to play, Flaishans was called for a 5-minute major and a game misconduct for checking from behind. The infraction meant that UNH would need to score twice more while down a man, making their already difficult task nearly impossible. Even after Notre Dame took a penalty of their own, the Wildcats surrendered 2 empty net goals, ending Flaishans' college career on a low note.

After graduating with a degree in business administration, Flaishans eschewed a professional sports career and instead joined Morgan Stanley as an analyst. Two years later he joined Clayton, Dubilier & Rice as an associate. In 2012, he entered the Harvard Business School, receiving his MBA two years later, and then rejoined Clayton, Dubilier & Rice as a principal. He has continued with the company in that capacity ever since (as of 2021).

Career statistics

Regular season and playoffs

Awards and honors

References

External links

1983 births
Living people
AHCA Division I men's ice hockey All-Americans
American men's ice hockey defensemen
Ice hockey people from Arizona
People from Glendale, Arizona
New Hampshire Wildcats men's ice hockey players
Harvard Business School alumni